The Lithuanian TDA Battalions or TDA, were paramilitary units organized in June–August 1941 by the Provisional Government of Lithuania at the onset of Operation Barbarossa. Members of the TDA were known by many names such as Lithuanian auxiliaries, policemen, white-armbands, nationalists, rebels, partisans, or resistance fighters. TDA was intended as basis for the future independent Lithuanian Army, but soon it was taken over by Nazi officials and reorganized into the Lithuanian Auxiliary Police Battalions (Lithuanian version of Schutzmannschaft). The original TDA eventually became the 12th and the 13th Police Battalions. These two units took an active role in mass killings of the Jews in Lithuania and Belarus. Based on the Jäger Report, members of TDA murdered about 26,000 Jews between July and December 1941.

Formation

As Nazi Germany declared war on the Soviet Union and invaded Lithuania, the Provisional Government of Lithuania declared independence on June 23, 1941. Lithuanians hoped to restore independent Lithuania that existed before the Soviet occupation or at least gain some autonomy from Nazi Germany. In an effort to re-establish Lithuanian Army, the Provisional Government announced the formation of the TDA in Kaunas on June 28. Plans for such a formation were made as early as March 24, 1941. TDA wore a white armband with black letters TDA on their sleeves. Andrius Butkūnas became the first commander of the newly formed battalion. 

The original goals of the formation were to protect strategic objects (like bridges or railways), guard Soviet prisoners of war, establish general order in Kaunas and in the vicinity. By July 4, 724 men, mostly former Lithuanian soldiers and partisans fighting in the June Uprising against the retreating Soviets, responded to the announcement and signed up for the battalion. By the end of July, seven companies were formed. At the time of its formation TDA was the only armed and organized group in Kaunas and Nazi authorities took advantage of it.

Activities

Executions of Jews
According to a July 6 report by Karl Jäger, commander of Einsatzgruppe A, two companies of TDA were assigned to duties related to mass murders of Jews: one was to guard and execute Jews at the Seventh Fort of the Kaunas Fortress and another was assigned to Einsatzkommando. According to extensive post-war investigations by Soviet authorities, as executions of Jews grew in number more companies of TDA were involved in the murders. In light of such developments TDA started losing its members: between July 5 and July 11, 117 members resigned. Commander of the 1st company, which was especially frequently involved in the executions, committed suicide on July 12. The 3rd company was assigned to the notorious Rollkommando Hamann commanded by Joachim Hamann and Bronius Norkus. The unit committed mass murders of Jews in the countryside. Based on the Jäger Report, members of TDA murdered about 26,000 Jews between July and December 1941.

Reorganizations
During the night between July 23 and 24, some members of the TDA were involved in an attempted coup against the Provisional Government. The coup, organized by members of the Iron Wolf Association and supported by German Gestapo, succeeded in replacing the leadership of the TDA. Iron Wolf now could promote or dismiss various members of TDA. Commander Butkūnas was replaced by Kazys Šimkus. 

The Provisional Government dissolved itself on August 5, 1941. The following day Franz Lechthaler took over the command of all police units, including TDA. On August 7, when TDA had 703 members, Lechthaler ordered the battalion to be reorganized into two battalions of auxiliary police or Hilfspolizei ( or PPT) and renamed accordingly. During August three more battalions of PPT were formed. In October these five battalions were renamed to security battalions.

Liquidation and persecution

In December, the five battalions were reorganized again: 

 1st battalion became the 13th, 
 2nd – 12th, 
 3rd – 11th battalions of Lithuanian Self-Defence Units. 

In 1942 the new 13th battalion was reassigned to combat Soviet partisans near Pskov and Tver. The 13th battalion started retreating with losing Wehrmacht in 1944. Its members were captured by Red Army or hid in Lithuanian forests. Many members were persecuted by Soviet authorities for their anti-Soviet activities. Some were executed, others imprisoned in Gulags. Soviet investigations continued until 1979 when the last execution was carried out in Minsk.

Notes

References

Lithuanian Auxiliary Police
The Holocaust in Lithuania
Local participation in the Holocaust
Einsatzgruppen